Spodoptera picta, the lily caterpillar, is a moth of the family Noctuidae. It was described by Félix Édouard Guérin-Méneville in 1838. It is found in from India, South-east Asia and Japan through Indonesia and the western part of South Pacific ocean to Fiji.

Description
The wingspan is about 40 mm. It is generally an ochreous-white moth. The head and thorax are suffused with pinkish red. The forewings have some red on their costal base. There are numerous ill-defined waved black lines present between the base and antemedial line. Orbicular and claviform consisting black rings. A medial pinkish red band, wide at costa narrowing to inner margin. The reniform with ochreous and black outlines and red center. The postmedial double waved lines are filled in with ochreous and highly excurved beyond the cell. Some black dashes can be seen on reddish patches beyond it. Hindwings semi-hyaline white.

Caterpillars have smooth skin and are pale grey with a series of longitudinal black lines. Mesothorax also has dark patches with last abdominal segment. With development, central dorsal line become yellowish.

Ecology

The larvae feed on Crinum asiaticum, Crinum pedunculatum, Clivia miniata, Hymenocallis littoralis, and Hippeastrum species. They bore into the leaves and down into the crown of the bulb. Eggs are laid on lily plants. The caterpillar pupates in leaf litter. Pupation takes place under ground in an earthen cocoon.

References

External links
 Calogramma picta image at Le Monde des insectes
 "Late Instar Caterpillar and Metamorphosis of Spodoptera picta Guérin-Méneville (Lepidoptera: Noctuidae: Noctuinae) With Notes On Its Cannibalistic Behaviour". Archived from the original October 3, 2016.

Moths described in 1838
Caradrinini